Illinois Route 10 (IL 10) is an arterial east–west state highway that runs from rural Mason County east to Champaign, a distance of .

Route description

Illinois 10 starts at US 136 about 12 miles east of Havana. The highway heads south to Easton, and then changes direction to reach Mason City and Lincoln. The highway passes through many small towns on the way to Champaign, and it runs through Clinton and by Clinton Lake. The highway closely parallels Interstate 72 for the last 10 miles before reaching US 150 in Champaign.

History
Illinois 10 has undergone major changes since it was initially established. Originally, SBI Route 10 followed Interstate 72 much more closely and ran from Jacksonville to Danville. Over the years, it has been dropped from Jacksonville, reinstated in Decatur, dropped entirely west of Danville, reapplied and dropped in Havana and then finally reapplied east of I-72. This last revision was made in 1974.

Major intersections

References

External links

 Illinois Highway Ends: Illinois Route 10

010
Lincoln, Illinois
Champaign, Illinois
Transportation in Mason County, Illinois
Transportation in Logan County, Illinois
Transportation in DeWitt County, Illinois
Transportation in Piatt County, Illinois
Transportation in Champaign County, Illinois